is a former Japanese idol and singer from the girl group NMB48, in which she is the co-captain of Team BII. She was also a member of the AKB48 and its subunit DiVA.

Biography

2004–2007: Early career, debut, injury
In 2004–2005, Umeda took part in the Morning Musume Lucky 7 Audition for the idol group Morning Musume, but only advanced to the second round.

On February 26, 2006, Umeda passed the second generation auditions for AKB48, and became one of 19 founding members for the group's Team K. Her on-stage debut was on April 1.  She performed on the title track for AKB48's first single on a major label, "Aitakatta", released on October 26, 2006. As part of Team K 1st Stage, she was a front member for the song "Skirt, Hirari", along with Sayaka Akimoto, Yuko Oshima, Sae Miyazawa, and Kana Kobayashi.

Later in the year, Umeda developed a stress fracture in her foot, and was recommended by her manager to take a break from her performances to rehabilitate, starting December 23. Her rehabilitation took about a year, during which she was active on TV in Fukuoka Prefecture.

2008–2011: Return to AKB48
On May 31, 2008, Umeda returned to public performances with the premiere of a new seasonal Team K's show at the AKB48 Theater, titled Team K 4th Stage "Saishū Bell ga Naru". Prior to her injuries, she was one of the faces of Team K, but after her return, she was placed at the very end of the stage, extremely far from the center position where she used to stand.

In February 2009, Umeda was chosen as the D1 Grand Prix image girl.

In April, she was named the Tokyo Tower image girl for the year 2009, succeeding fellow AKB48 member Ayumi Orii.

In the AKB48 general election for 2010, Umeda placed 32nd, with 2,499 votes.

2011: Diva, rise in AKB48
On February 27, 2011, it was announced to the public that a new pop group named DiVA, consisting of Sayaka Akimoto, Yuka Masuda, Sae Miyazawa, and Ayaka Umeda had been formed. The group's debut single "Tsuki no Uragawa", whose release was originally scheduled for April 27, and postponed until May 18 due to the 2011 Tōhoku earthquake and tsunami, reached number 3 on the Oricon Weekly Singles Chart.

In the annual election, she placed 22nd, and headlined the Under Girls on the single's coupling track. In the AKB48 rock-paper-scissors tournament, which took place on September 20, she finished in the top 16, which earned her a spot on the title track. The song "Ue kara Mariko" became her first A-side of an AKB48's single in three and a half years, since "Baby! Baby! Baby!".

2012: Team B captain
On June 6, in the AKB48 general election, she placed 16th and landed a spot on the title track for "Gingham Check".

On August 24, AKB48 announced a major reorganization, where Umeda moved to Team B and became the team's captain.

In the third AKB48 rock-paper-scissors tournament, which took place in September 2012, Umeda advanced to the top 16, and secured a title track spot on the group's 29th single, "Eien Pressure".

2013: Senbatsu Election

Umeda ranked 19th in AKB48's general election, placing her in Undergirls and subsequently giving her a spot on the main B-side track of the election single, Koi Suru Fortune Cookie.

2014: Transfer to NMB48

On February 24, 2014, in the AKB48 Dai Sokaku Matsuri Shuffle, Umeda was completely transferred to NMB48 and became co-captain of Team BII.

2016: Departing NMB48

On January 23, 2016, at AKB48 Request Hour Setlist Best 100 2016, Umeda announced of leaving NMB48. On March 20, she graduated from the group and her graduation ceremony was hold on March 31, 2016, at Zepp Namba.

Singles with AKB48

Singles with NMB48

Singles with SKE48

AKB48 stage units
Team K 1st Stage "Party ga Hajimaru yo"
"Skirt, Hirari"
Team K 2nd Stage "Seishun Girls"
"Ame no Dōbutsuen"
"Fushidara na Natsu"
Team K 3rd Stage "Nōnai Paradise"
"Maria"
Team K 4th Stage "Saishu Bell ga Naru"
"Return Match"
Team K 5th Stage "Sakaagari"
"End Roll"
Team K 6th Stage "Reset"
"Kokoro no Sofa"
"Kiseki wa Maniawanai"

Filmography

TV series
 (Ep. 1, January 13. 2010, MBS)
Majisuka Gakuen (Last ep., March 26, 2010, TV Tokyo)
Kankyō Chōjin Ecogainder (June 26 – November 1, 2010, Kids Station)
Majisuka Gakuen 2 (Last ep., July 1, 2011, TV Tokyo) — Ayaka

References

External links
 NMB48 Official Profile (Japanese)
 フレイヴ・エンターテインメント Official Profile(Japanese)
 梅田彩佳 オフィシャルブログ 「Dance Studio UMEDA」 – Ameba (アメーバブログ)（20 June 2011  – ）(Japanese)
 梅田彩佳 Official blog – GREE(Japanese)
 （8 March 2011  – ）(Japanese)

Living people
1989 births
People from Fukuoka Prefecture
Japanese idols
AKB48 members
Musicians from Fukuoka Prefecture
21st-century Japanese women singers
21st-century Japanese singers